Valley Junction is a small unincorporated community in Robertson County, Texas, United States. It is located near what used to be Robertson's Colony, the colony founded by Sterling C. Robertson when he moved from Nashville, Tennessee.

Its coordinates are Lat:30.841858,
Nearby cities include:
 Goodland, Texas 3.3 mi. NW
 Hearne, Texas 3.7 mi. NE
 Bryan, Texas 24.7 mi. SE

Railroad junction
A railroad junction was created by the Hearne and Brazos Valley Railway extending 16 miles connecting the International and Great Northern Railways in 1892. A flood of 1899 almost completely destroyed the tracks but were rebuilt in another location. By 1930, the Valley Junction location became part of a 2,500-mile system build by the Missouri Pacific Railway which ran from Valley Junction North through Waco to Fort Worth.

Present day
Currently Valley Junction is a small agricultural based community without an official federally recognized name. It has deep colonial history as it was included in the original colonization project known as the Nashville Company, given to Robertson as described in the book by McLean, Papers Concerning Robertson's Colony in Texas, Volume XVIII.

External links 
http://texas.hometownlocator.com/index.cfm
https://tshaonline.org/handbook/online/articles/eqm06
http://www.histopolis.com/Place?US/TX/Robertson_County/Valley_Junction/
McLean, Papers Concerning Robertson's Colony in Texas, Volume XVIII

Unincorporated communities in Robertson County, Texas
Unincorporated communities in Texas